Nolin may refer to:

Surname 
Charles Nolin (1837–1907), Métis farmer and political organiser, opposing the North-West Rebellion of 1885
Gena Lee Nolin (born 1971), American actress and model
Jean-Baptiste Nolin (c.1657–1708), French cartographer and engraver
Joseph Nolin (1866–1925), Canadian provincial politician
Marie-Paule Nolin (1908–1987), French Canadian high-fashion designer
Michael Nolin, American motion picture producer, studio executive, writer/director and educator
Pierre Claude Nolin (1950–2015), Canadian politician and Senator
Rebecca Nolin (born 1983), English professional soccer player
Sean Nolin (born 1989), American professional baseball pitcher

Places 
Nolin, Oregon, unincorporated community in Umatilla County, Oregon, United States
Nolin Lake State Park, park located in Edmonson County, Kentucky, United States
Nolin River, tributary of the Green River, 105 mi (169 km) long, in central Kentucky in the United States
Nolin River Lake, reservoir in Edmonson, Grayson, and Hart counties in Kentucky